This is a list of members of the 57th Legislative Assembly of Queensland from 2020 to 2024, as elected at the 2020 election held on 31 October 2020.

 The Labor member for Stretton, Duncan Pegg, announced his resignation to undergo cancer treatment on 22 April 2021, but had not formally resigned at the time of his death on 10 June 2021. Labor candidate James Martin was elected to replace him at a by-election on 24 July 2021.
 The LNP member for Callide, Colin Boyce, resigned on 29 March 2022 to contest the 2022 federal election. LNP candidate Bryson Head was elected to replace him at a by-election on 18 June 2022.

References

Members of Queensland parliaments by term
21st-century Australian politicians